"The Turnip" (German: die Rübe) is a German fairy tale collected by the Brothers Grimm in Grimm's Fairy Tales (KHM 146).

It is of Aarne-Thompson type 1960D ("The Giant Vegetable") and of type 1689A ("Two Presents for the King"), with an episode of type 1737 ("Trading Places with the Trickster in a Sack").

Synopsis

Two brothers, one rich, one poor, served as soldiers, but the poor one had to become a farmer to escape his poverty.  One of his turnips grew to an enormous size, and he gave it to the king.  The king gave him rich presents in return.  The rich brother gave the king many great presents, and the king gave him the turnip in return.  Angry, the rich brother hired murderers and lured his brother on a path, but when the murderers were going to hang the poor brother, they heard someone singing, and they threw the poor brother into a sack and hanged it, before running off.  The poor brother worked a hole in the sack and saw the man, who was a student.  He told him that it was the Sack of Knowledge, and he was learning marvelous things in it.  The student asked to change places with him.  The poor brother agreed and hefted him up, telling him that he was learning something already, but after an hour, he sent someone to let the student down.

See also

The Gigantic Turnip

References

Further reading

External links

 

Turnip
ATU 1675-1724
ATU 1875-1999